Heymann is a German surname. Notable people with the surname include:
Andreas Heymann (born 1966), French biathlete
Aribert Heymann (1898–1946), German field hockey player
Barak Heymann, Israeli film director and producer
Carl Heymann (also: Karl Heymann, 1854–1922), German pianist
Carsten Heymann (born 1972), German biathlete
Claude Heymann (1907–1994), French screenwriter and film director
Danièle Heymann (1933-2019), French journalist and film critic
David Heymann (disambiguation), multiple people
Delphyne Heymann (born 1966)
Erika Heymann (1895–1950), German woman posthumously conferred Righteous Among the Nations
Ernst Heymann (1870–1946), German jurist
Ezra Heymann (1928–2014), philosopher and university professor
Franz Ferdinand Heymann (1924–2005), British physicist
Isaac Heymann (1829–1906), Dutch cantor and composer
 (born 1925), footballer
Juan Andrade Heymann (born 1945), Ecuadorian writer, novelist, short story writer, poet, and playwright
Klaus Heymann (born 1936), German entrepreneur
Lida Gustava Heymann (1868–1943), German feminist, pacifist and women's rights activist
Lindy Heymann, British director
Margarete Heymann (1899–1990), German ceramic artist
Mathias Heymann, dancer
Philip Heymann (born 1932), American jurist
Robert Heymann (1879–1946), German screenwriter and film director
Stephen Heymann, Assistant U.S. Attorney for the District of Massachusetts
Tomer Heymann (born 1970), Israeli filmmaker
Vania Heymann (born 1986), Israeli artist and film director
Werner R. Heymann (1896–1961), German conductor and composer
William Heymann (1885–1969), English cricketer

See also 
 
Heymann Steinthal (1823–1899), German philologist and philosopher
Carl Heymanns Verlag, German publisher
Hayman
Heyman
Heiman
Hyman
Hijmans

German-language surnames